Lygaeus is a genus of seed bugs in the family Lygaeidae. There are more than 60 described species in Lygaeus.

Species
These 69 species belong to the genus Lygaeus:

 Lygaeus alboornatus Blanchard, 1852
 Lygaeus analis Dallas, 1852
 Lygaeus argutus Brailovsky, 1982
 Lygaeus ashlocki Brailovsky, 1978
 Lygaeus bahamensis Barber & Ashlock, 1960
 Lygaeus bettoni Distant, 1901
 Lygaeus buettikeri Hamid & Hamid, 1985
 Lygaeus coccineus Barber, 1923
 Lygaeus cognatus Walker, 1872
 Lygaeus creticus Lucas, 1853
 Lygaeus cruentatus Costa, 1839
 Lygaeus dichrous Montrouzier, 1855
 Lygaeus discifer Motschulsky, 1863
 Lygaeus dives Distant, 1918
 Lygaeus dohertyi Distant, 1904
 Lygaeus equestris (Linnaeus, 1758) (black-and-red bug)
 Lygaeus flavescens Winkler & Kerzhner, 1977
 Lygaeus flavomarginatus Matsumura, 1913
 Lygaeus formosanus Shiraki, 1913
 Lygaeus froeschneri Brailovsky, 1978
 Lygaeus hanseni Jakovlev, 1883
 Lygaeus inaequalis Walker, 1872
 Lygaeus kalmii Stal, 1874 (small milkweed bug)
 Lygaeus leucospilus Walker, 1870
 Lygaeus longiusculus Walker, 1872
 Lygaeus lugubris Montrouzier, 1855
 Lygaeus mauli Faúndez, Carvajal, Diez & Raffo, 2021
 Lygaeus melanostolus (Kiritshenko, 1928)
 Lygaeus multiguttatus Herrich-Schaeffer, 1850
 Lygaeus murinus (Kiritshenko, 1913)
 Lygaeus negus Distant, 1918
 Lygaeus oppositus Brailovsky, 1978
 Lygaeus oreophilus (Kiritshenko, 1931)
 Lygaeus pallipes Wolff, 1804
 Lygaeus peruvianus Brailovsky, 1978
 Lygaeus pubicornis Fabricius, 1775
 Lygaeus quadratomaculatus Kirby, 1891
 Lygaeus reclivatus Say, 1825 (southern small milkweed bug)
 Lygaeus scabrosus Fabricius, 1775
 Lygaeus sexpustulatus (Fabricius, 1775)
 Lygaeus signatus Costa, 1862
 Lygaeus simulans Deckert, 1985
 Lygaeus sipolisi Fallou, 1891
 Lygaeus sjostedti (Lindberg, 1934)
 Lygaeus slateri Gorski, 1968
 Lygaeus taitensis Guerin, 1838
 Lygaeus teraphoides Jakovlev, 1890
 Lygaeus tristriatus Herrich-Schaeffer, 1850
 Lygaeus truculentus Stal, 1862
 Lygaeus trux Stal, 1862
 Lygaeus turcicus Fabricius, 1803 (false milkweed bug)
 Lygaeus vaccaroi Mancini, 1954
 Lygaeus vicarius Winkler & Kerzhner, 1977
 Lygaeus wangi Zheng & Zou, 1992
 † Lygaeus atavinus Heer, 1853
 † Lygaeus celasensis Theobald, 1937
 † Lygaeus dasypus Heer, 1853
 † Lygaeus dellachiaje Hope *, 1847
 † Lygaeus deprehensus Heyden, 1859
 † Lygaeus deucalionis Heer, 1853
 † Lygaeus elongatiabdominalis Theobald, 1937
 † Lygaeus faeculentus Scudder, 1890
 † Lygaeus gracilentus Forster *, 1891
 † Lygaeus gratiosus Forster *, 1891
 † Lygaeus heeri Slater, 1964
 † Lygaeus obscurellus Theobald, 1937
 † Lygaeus obsolescens Scudder, 1890
 † Lygaeus stabilitus Scudder, 1890
 † Lygaeus tinctus Heer, 1853

References

External links

 
 

Lygaeidae
Hemiptera of Europe
Insect pests of millets